Sirimavo Bandaranaike Vidyalaya is one of the leading Public Girls schools  in Colombo, Sri Lanka. It is a National public school controlled by the central government, provide primary and secondary education.

Overview
The school was inaugurated on 1 January 1973 as Stanmore Crescent Primary School and renamed in December 1973 as Sirimavo Bandaranaike Primary Girls School in honor of then Prime Minister Sirimavo Bandaranaike. From a Primary School, the school developed into a secondary school and finally to a leading national school within seventeen years of period.

At present, the school has over 3000 students and a staff of about 180 including approximately 45 members of the non-academic staff.

History

Sirimavo Bandaranaike Vidyalaya was inaugurated on 1 January 1973, as Stanmore Crescent Primary School with 5 teachers and 149 students under the able guidance of Miss Wimala Liyanage, the founder principal. Her name was "Stanmore Crescent Primary School". The school consisted of classes up to grade five.

After eleven months of deliberation, the then Deputy Minister of Education B. Y. Tudawe suggested to change the name of the school in honor of late Madame Sirimavo Bandaranaike who was the first lady Prime Minister of the world.

After the initial batch of students finished five years of Primary Education, classes had to be extended to provide Secondary Education and in due course classes up to Year 13 were established. Due to the patronage of former principals Miss. Wimala Liyanage (1973–1982), and Mrs. R.M.L. Jayasekera (1982–2000) the status of the school was raised to level of a National School in 1991. Under the guidance of Miss W.P.N. De Silva (2000–2003) the school's academic and co-curricular activities were further developed.

Mrs. P.M. Kalubowila assumed duties as the principal from 6 November 2003 having joined Sirimavo Bandaranaike Vidyalaya in 1986 as a Chemistry teacher.  Ever since up to date Mrs. Kalubowila also has been dedicated herself to serve the school in the sphere of educational and co-curricular activities and to upgrade the infra-structure facilities and resources development of the school.

In July 2009, Mrs. Kalubowila ordered all students to shut down their Facebook profiles, with a threat of expulsion from school for disobedience. This sparked a controversy in the school system in Sri Lanka. After the retirement of Mrs. P.M. Kalubowila in February 2012, the newly appointed principal Mrs. Dhammika C. Jayaneththi has taken over.
Mrs. Malini Herath was appointed as principal in 2013 and she is class 1 in Sri Lanka Education Administrative Service.

School motto

School flag

Past principals
Miss Wimala Liyanage (1973–1982)
Mrs R. M. L. Jayasekera (1982–2000)
Miss W. P. N. De Silva (2000–2003)
Mrs P. M. Kalubowila (2003-2012)
Mrs R. M. Herath (2014 to date)

Achievements
The students of Sirimavo Bandaraniake Vidyala have accomplished the following achievements in many national and international events.

Clubs and societies
More than 30 clubs and societies are available. Every club and society has a member of the teaching staff overseeing things and helping with administration and organising events.

 Agriculture Society
 Astronomical Society
 Aviation Society
 Buddhist Society
 Cadets Platoon
 Career Guidance and Skills Society
 Commerce Society
 Disaster Management Unit
 Domestic Science Society
 Drama Unit English
 Drug Abuse Prevention Society
 Elocution and Debating Society
 English Literary Association

 Environmental Society
 French Club
Gavel Club 
 General Knowledge Society
 Girl Guides and Little Friends Society
 Global Friends Club
 Good Friends Society
 Information Technology Society
 Japanese Language Society
 Law Circle
 Leaders Foundation
 Media Unit
 Novel Invention Society

 Oriental Music Society
 Philatelic Club
 Photographic Society
 Practical Technology Skills Society
 Print Media Unit
 Ran-Kekulu Savings Foundation
 Science-Mathematics Society
 Security and Traffic Warden Society
 Sinhala Literature Association
 Sisu-Udana Society
 Society of Fine Arts
 Teachers Welfare Society
 UNESCO Society
 Western Music Society
 Quality Circle

Sports

 Athletics
 Badminton
 Basketball
 Carrom
 Chess
 Gymnastic
 Hockey
 Netball
 Physical Training
 Rowing
 Squash
 Swimming
 Table Tennis
 Throwball
 Volleyball
 Soccer
 Scrabble 
 Rifle Shooting

Infrastructure facilities (recent and ongoing projects)

School library

The school library was set up in 1982 with the assistance of the Sri Lanka Library Services Board. In 1996, a program titled "Library Week" was inaugurated during the "Reading Month". Library facilities are provided to all the pupils of the school and there are two libraries separately; one for Primary Grades and other for seniors. A reference section and a lending library section function and about 250 students are benefit daily from the lending library section. Books are issued on a daily basis to advanced level students and on the recommendation of teachers in charge books are provided to pupils taking part in "Do You Know "contests and debating teams. The strength of the library is about 15000 books.
Magazine section has been organized to improve the General Knowledge of the students.

Construction of a new state of the art library complex is in progress.

Swimming Pool

SBV Swimming Pool was ceremonially opened by the first lady of Sri Lanka, Madam Shiranthi Rajapaksa on 28 October 2008. Principal of the school Ms Pushpa Kalubowila, Education Minister Susil Premjayanth and Sports Minister Gamini Lokuge were associated with the First Lady at the opening ceremony.

A swimming pool was a long felt need of the Sirimavians. Many problems arose in attending training sessions in other pools specially transport problems and supervision. As such a strong request was made by the students to commence work on a school swimming pool. As a result, the foundation for the school swimming pool was laid in October 2006. Many projects were launched to raise funds for the project. Swimming pool project was completed in 2 years time and that was considered as an achievement. Swimming Pool caters to the long felt need of the Sirimavians and foster the advancements in the sphere of sports.

Swimming pool facilities are open to all present and past Sirimavians, Teachers and the community.

Notable alumni

References

External links
 Official Web Sirimavo Bandaranaike Vidyalaya
 Sirimavo Bandaranaike Vidyalaya

1973 establishments in Sri Lanka
Educational institutions established in 1973
Girls' schools in Sri Lanka
National schools in Sri Lanka
Schools in Colombo